Aldershot Shots also known later as Aldershot Poppies were a speedway team  that existed from 1950 to 1960, they were based primarily at Aldershot Stadium in Tongham, near Farnham.

Brief history
In 1929, eight meetings were held at Boxalls Lane before the sport was introduced to the Tongham track in 1950. They first competed in the National League Division Three in 1950 and were based at Aldershot Stadium, where the team finished the season in fifth place. In 1951, the finished slightly better in third place. The star of the 1950 and 1951 team was Trevor Redmond while his fellow Kiwi Geoff Mardon was also a star man.

In 1952, the third division was replaced by the Southern League and Aldershot finished 7th. In 1953, the stadium was used for open meetings. 

A team called the California Poppies moved to Aldershot in 1957 and were renamed the Aldershot Poppies. The team competed in the 1957 Southern Area League, Aldershot reverted back to the name Shots and had one more season of league racing in 1959.

In 1960, after a short season of open meetings, the track closed.

Season summary

See also
List of defunct motorcycle speedway teams in the United Kingdom

References

Defunct British speedway teams
Sport in Aldershot